Francisco Morales Vivas (born August 31, 1971) is a retired male judoka from Argentina. He claimed the gold medal in the Men's Featherweight (– 65 kg) division at the 1991 Pan American Games in Havana, Cuba. Morales represented his native country in two consecutive Summer Olympics, starting in 1992.

References

External links
 

1971 births
Living people
Argentine male judoka
Judoka at the 1991 Pan American Games
Judoka at the 1995 Pan American Games
Judoka at the 1992 Summer Olympics
Judoka at the 1996 Summer Olympics
Olympic judoka of Argentina
Pan American Games gold medalists for Argentina
Pan American Games silver medalists for Argentina
Pan American Games medalists in judo
Medalists at the 1995 Pan American Games